Khandepar is a census town in Ponda taluka, North Goa district in the state of Goa, India.

References
 

Cities and towns in South Goa district
Villages in South Goa district